James McConvill is an Australian lawyer who has been a legal scholar, and also a writer and lecturer.

He is the editor of the international corporate governance journal, The Corporate Governance Law Review.  He works at Victoria University, Melbourne, where he takes corporations law and looks after the Master's degree and Doctorate students.

Education and career
After completing law school from Deakin University, McConvill worked as a corporate lawyer for three years with the Australian firm, Allens Arthur Robinson (AAR).  Following his time at AAR, he worked at Deakin University and La Trobe University before becoming a principal at  The Corporate Research Group, International, an Australian think-tank on corporate governance, his academic specialty. He has also become director of the Asia-Pacific Centre for American Law.

Writings

Books
McConvill has written several books on corporate government and related subjects
Principles of contemporary corporate governance, by J J Du Plessis;  James McConvill;  Mirko Bagaric. Cambridge [England] ; New York : Cambridge University Press, 2005. 
Shareholder participation and the corporation : a fresh inter-disciplinary approach in happiness. by James McConvill. Abingdon [England] ; New York : Routledge-Cavendish, 2006. 
In the pursuit of truth : reflections on law, life and contemporary affairs by James McConvill South Yarra, Vic. : Sandstone Academic Press, ©2006. 
Coming down the mountain : rethinking takeovers regulation in Australia by James McConvillSouth Yarra Victoria, Australia : Sandstone Academic Press, 2006.	
An introduction to CLERP 9 by James McConvill. Chatswood, N.S.W. : LexisNexis, 2004. 
The false promise of pay for performance : embracing a positive model of the company executive by James McConvill. South Yarra, Victoria, Australia : Sandstone Academic Press, 2005.

Articles
He has also written at least 50 peer-reviewed articles in American, British, German, and Australian legal journals.

Fraser controversy 
McConvill gained national attention in Australia during 2005, when editor of the Deakin Law Review, for agreeing to publish an article called "Rethinking the White Australia Policy" by Professor Drew Fraser. The article was withdrawn after the Sudanese community in Australia threatened to sue Deakin University. Media at the time reported concerns that the article was both racist and xenophobic.

References

Year of birth missing (living people)
Australian non-fiction writers
Living people